Swarajeet Das (born 23 March 1995) is an Indian cricketer. He made his first-class debut for Meghalaya in the 2018–19 Ranji Trophy on 6 December 2018. He made his Twenty20 debut for Meghalaya in the 2018–19 Syed Mushtaq Ali Trophy on 21 February 2019. He made his List A debut on 24 September 2019, for Meghalaya in the 2019–20 Vijay Hazare Trophy.

References

External links
 

1995 births
Living people
Indian cricketers
Place of birth missing (living people)
Meghalaya cricketers